The following is a list of the first openly lesbian, gay, bisexual and/or transgender individuals to serve in selected political offices in the United Kingdom.

Party leaderships
 2008, First out male Leader of a political party in Scotland
 Patrick Harvie, Scottish Greens, MSP 2003–present
 2011, First out female Leader of a political party in Scotland
 Ruth Davidson, Scottish Conservatives, MSP 2011–2019
 2018, First out male leader of a political party in Wales
 Adam Price, Plaid Cymru, AM/MS 2016–present
 2020, First black, bisexual leader of a political party in the United Kingdom
 Mandu Reid, Women's Equality Party, since 2020

UK Cabinet
 1997, First male Cabinet minister to be out before being appointed
 Chris Smith, Labour, MP 1983–2005
 2016, First male Cabinet minister to come out in office
 David Mundell, Conservative, MP 2005–present
 2016, First female Cabinet minister to come out in office
 Justine Greening, Conservative, MP 2005–2019

British Parliament

House of Commons
 1597, First known LGBTQ+ Member of Parliament
 Anthony Bacon, Independent, elected as MP for Wallingford in 1593
 1976, First outed (female) MP
 Maureen Colquhoun, Labour, MP 1974–1979
 1984, First MP to come out in office
 Chris Smith, Labour, MP 1983–2005
 May 1997, First MPs to be out before being elected
 Stephen Twigg, Labour, MP 1997–2005, 2010–2019
 Ben Bradshaw, Labour, MP 1997–present
 Sep 1997, First female MP to come out in office
 Angela Eagle, Labour, MP 1992–Present
 June 2001, First out Plaid Cymru MP
 Adam Price, Plaid Cymru, MP 2001–2010
 2002, First Conservative MP to come out
 Alan Duncan, Conservative, MP 1992–2019
 Jan 2005, First MP to come out as HIV positive
 Chris Smith, Labour, MP 1983–2005
 May 2005, First out Liberal Democrat MP
 Stephen Williams, Liberal Democrats, MP 2005–2015
 May 2005, First Conservative MP to be out before being elected
 Nick Herbert, Conservative, MP 2005–2019
 Jan 2006, First MP to be outed as bisexual
 Simon Hughes, Liberal Democrat, MP 1983–2015
 May 2006, First MP to enter into a civil partnership
 David Borrow, Labour, MP 1997–2010
 2008, First female MP to enter into a civil partnership
 Angela Eagle, Labour, MP 1992–present
 2010, First female MP to be out before being elected, and first out Conservative female MP
 Margot James, Conservative, MP 2010–2019
 December 2010, First out Deputy Speaker
 Nigel Evans, First Chairman of Ways and Means 2010-2013, Second Chairman of Ways and Means 2020–present
 2013, First MP to voluntarily come out as bisexual
 Daniel Kawczynski, Conservative, MP 2005–present
 2015, First MP to be out as bisexual before being elected; First female MP to be out as bisexual
 Cat Smith, Labour, MP 2015–present
 2020, First MP to come out as pansexual
 Layla Moran, Liberal Democrat, MP 2017–present
 2022, First MP to come out as trans
 Jamie Wallis, Conservative, MP 2019–present

House of Lords
 First out Peer
 Lord Alli, Labour, 1998–present
 First out female Peer
 Deborah Stedman-Scott, Baroness Stedman-Scott, Conservative, 2010–present

European Parliament
 Jan 1999, First out UK MEP
 Tom Spencer, Conservative, MEP 1979–1984, 1989–1999
 Jun 1999, First UK MEP to be out before office
 Michael Cashman, Labour, MEP 1999–2014
 2013, First openly transgender UK MEP
 Nikki Sinclaire, UK Independence Party (later Independent), MEP 2009–2014
 2019, First gay and black UK MEP
 Louis Stedman-Bryce, Brexit Party (later Independent), MEP 2019–2020

Scottish Parliament
 First out MSP
 Iain Smith, Scottish Liberal Democrats, MSP 1999–2011
 2003, First out Female MSP
 Margaret Smith, Scottish Liberal Democrats, 1999–2011
 2003, First out Scottish Green MSP
 Patrick Harvie, Scottish Green Party, MSP 2003–present
 2007, First out SNP MSP
 Joe FitzPatrick, Scottish National Party, MSP 2007–present
 2011, First out Scottish Conservative MSP
 Ruth Davidson, Scottish Conservative Party, MSP 2011–present
 2016, First out Scottish Labour MSP
 Kezia Dugdale, Scottish Labour Party, MSP 2011–present

Scottish Government
 1999, First out minister
 Iain Smith, Scottish Liberal Democrats, Deputy Minister for Parliament
 2016, First out Cabinet minister
 Derek Mackay, Scottish National Party, Cabinet Secretary for Finance and the Constitution
 2016, First out female minister
 Jeane Freeman, Scottish National Party, Minister for Social Security

Senedd
 First out AM,
 Ron Davies, Labour, 1999–2003
 First out cabinet secretary to be appointed Jeremy Miles, Labour, 2017–present
 First out minister to be appointed Hannah Blythyn, Labour, 2017–present

Northern Ireland Assembly
 First out MLA
 John Blair, Alliance, 2018–present

Police and crime commissioner
 First out PCC
 Olly Martins, Labour, 2012–2016

Directly elected mayors
 First out directly elected executive mayor
 Mike Wolfe, Mayor4Stoke, 2002–2005
 First out directly elected metropolitan mayor
 Paul Dennett, Labour, 2016–present
 First out directly elected London borough mayor
 Philip Glanville, Labour, 2016–present

Municipal offices

England
Bolton
 Horwich Town Council: First open lesbian as mayor (2013–2014) civil partner mayoress: Christine A. Root

Brighton & Hove City Council
 First out committee chair and group leader Paul Elgood (1999–2012)

Bristol
 First out Trans councillor and first to transition while holding elected public office: Rosalind Mitchell (1997) 

Cambridge, Cambridgeshire
 First trans mayor: Jenny Bailey (2007–2008)

Camden
 First openly gay Mayor and Mayoress (2010–2011): Jonathan Simpson and Amy Lamé

Durham
 First openly gay councillor in the UK and first known openly gay candidate for UK elected office: Sam Green (1972)

Essex – Epping Forest District Council
 Gavin Chambers (2012–present), mayor of the parish council (2012–2013)

Hackney
 First openly gay directly elected mayor: Philip Glanville (2016–present)

Islington
 Mayor: Robert Crossman (1986)

Kingston upon Hull
 Lord Mayor: Colin Inglis (elected 2011) Council Leader 2003–2005, Police Authority Chair 2000–2005

Liverpool
 First openly gay Lord Mayor: Gary Millar (2013–2014)

Manchester
 First openly gay Lord Mayor: Carl Austin-Behan (2016–2017)

Salford
 First openly gay Mayor: Paul Dennett

Sheffield
 First openly gay Leader of the Council: Paul Scriven (2008–2011)

Trafford
 First openly gay leader of the council: Sean Anstee (2014–2018)
Haslemere, Surrey
 First openly gay deputy mayor: Sahran Abeysundara (elected 2015)
 First openly gay mayor: Sahran Abeysundara (elected 2016)

London
Greater London Authority
 First members of the London Assembly: Brian Coleman, Andrew Boff and Richard Barnes - Conservative and Darren Johnson - Green Party (elected 2000)
 First openly gay deputy mayor: Richard Barnes (appointed 2008)

Southwark
 First openly gay mayor: Jeff Hook:

Camden
 First openly gay mayor: Jonathan Simpson (elected 2010)

Richmond
 Mayor: Marc Cranfield-Adams (2007)

Wales
Aberystwyth, Ceredigion
 First openly lesbian mayor, with her partner as mayoress: Jaci Taylor (2000–2001), Plaid Cymru.

Rhondda Cynon Taf
 First openly gay cabinet member Layton Percy Jones (Plaid Cymru). Cabinet Member for Social Services 1999–2005

Milford Haven, Pembrokeshire
 First openly gay mayor, first mayor in a civil partnership: Guy Woodham (2012–2013)
 First openly gay mayor and deputy mayor: William Elliott (mayor) and Colin Sharp (deputy mayor)

 Abertillery, Blaenau Gwent
 First openly bisexual chairman of council, Julian Meek (2012–2013), Plaid Cymru.

 Bangor, Gwynedd
 The world's first non-binary Mayor and Wales' youngest ever Mayor, Owen Hurcum (2021–2022), Independent

See also
 List of LGBT politicians in the United Kingdom

References

LGBT
United Kingdom